Simon Hunt may refer to:

Pauline Pantsdown (also known as Simon Hunt), Australian satirist and former Australian Senate candidate 
Simon Hunt (footballer) (born 1963), former English footballer
Simon Hunt (rugby union) (born 1981), English rugby player
Simon Hunt (cricketer) (born 1962), former English cricketer